This is a list of Departments of Government of Punjab, India. For a historical list of ministers who have served in the Punjab government see List of ministers in the Government of Punjab, India. For a list of current ministers see Mann ministry

References

Government of Punjab, India
Mann
State cabinet ministers of Punjab, India
2022 in Indian politics
Mann ministry